Beatrice Palner (31 January 1938 – 4 April 2013) was a Danish film actress. She appeared in 21 films between 1961 and 1989. She was born in Helsingør, Denmark.

Selected filmography
 Støv på hjernen (1961)
 Det støver stadig (1962)
 Frøken Nitouche (1963)
 Støv for alle pengene (1963)
 Passer passer piger (1965)
 Terror (1977)

References

External links

1938 births
2013 deaths
Danish film actresses
People from Helsingør